The gens Julia was one of the most prominent patrician families in ancient Rome.  Members of the gens attained the highest dignities of the state in the earliest times of the Republic.  The first of the family to obtain the consulship was Gaius Julius Iulus in 489 BC.  The gens is perhaps best known, however, for Gaius Julius Caesar, the dictator and grand uncle of the emperor Augustus, through whom the name was passed to the so-called Julio-Claudian dynasty of the first century AD.  The  Julius became very common in imperial times, as the descendants of persons enrolled as citizens under the early emperors began to make their mark in history.

Origin

The Julii were of Alban origin, mentioned as one of the leading Alban houses, which Tullus Hostilius removed to Rome upon the destruction of Alba Longa. The Julii also existed at an early period at Bovillae, evidenced by a very ancient inscription on an altar in the theatre of that town, which speaks of their offering sacrifices according to the lege Albana, or Alban rites. Some of the Julii may have settled at Bovillae after the fall of Alba Longa.

As it became the fashion in the later times of the Republic to claim a divine origin for the most distinguished of the Roman gentes, it was contended that Iulus, the mythical ancestor of the race, was the same as Ascanius, the son of Aeneas, and founder of Alba Longa.  Aeneas was, in turn, the son of Venus and Anchises.  In order to prove the identity of Ascanius and Iulus, recourse was had to etymology, some specimens of which the reader curious in such matters will find in Servius.  Other traditions held that Iulus was the son of Aeneas by his Trojan wife, Creusa, while Ascanius was the son of Aeneas and Lavinia, daughter of Latinus.

The dictator Caesar frequently alluded to the divine origin of his race, as, for instance, in the funeral oration which he pronounced when quaestor over his aunt Julia, and in giving Venus Genetrix as the word to his soldiers at the battles of Pharsalus and Munda; and subsequent writers and poets were ready enough to fall in with a belief which flattered the pride and exalted the origin of the imperial family.

Though it would seem that the Julii first came to Rome in the reign of Tullus Hostilius, the name occurs in Roman legend as early as the time of Romulus.  It was Proculus Julius who was said to have informed the sorrowing Roman people, after the strange departure of Romulus from the world, that their king had descended from heaven and appeared to him, bidding him tell the people to honor him in future as a god, under the name of Quirinus.  Some modern critics have inferred from this, that a few of the Julii might have settled in Rome in the reign of the first king; but considering the entirely fabulous nature of the tale, and the circumstance that the celebrity of the Julia gens in later times would easily lead to its connection with the earliest times of Roman story, no historical argument can be drawn from the mere name occurring in this legend.

In the later Empire, the distinction between praenomen, nomen, and cognomen was gradually lost, and Julius was treated much like a personal name, which it ultimately became.  The Latin form is common in many languages, but other familiar forms exist, including Giulio (Italian), Julio (Spanish), Jules (French), Júlio (Portuguese), Iuliu (Romanian) and Юлий (Yuliy, Bulgarian and Russian).

Praenomina
The Julii of the Republic used the praenomina Lucius, Gaius, and Sextus.  There are also instances of Vopiscus and Spurius in the early generations of the family.  The earliest of the Julii appearing in legend bore the praenomen Proculus, and it is possible that this name was used by some of the early Julii, although no later examples are known.  In the later Republic and imperial times, Vopiscus and Proculus were generally used as personal cognomina.

The gens was always said to have descended from and been named after a mythical personage named Iulus or Iullus, even before he was asserted to be the son of Aeneas; and it is entirely possible that Iulus was an ancient praenomen, which had fallen out of use by the early Republic, and was preserved as a cognomen by the eldest branch of the Julii.  The name was later revived as a praenomen by Marcus Antonius, the triumvir, who had a son named Iulus.  Classical Latin did not distinguish between the letters "I" and "J", which were both written with "I", and for this reason the name is sometimes written Julus, just as Julius is also written Iulius.

The many Julii of imperial times, who were not descended from the gens Julia, did not limit themselves to the praenomina of that family.  The imperial family set the example by freely mingling the praenomina of the Julii with those of the gens Claudia, using titles and cognomina as praenomina, and regularly changing their praenomina to reflect the political winds of the empire.

Branches and cognomina

The family-names of the Julii in the time of the Republic are Caesar, Iulus, Mento, and Libo, of which the first three are undoubtedly patrician; but the only families which were particularly celebrated were those of Iulus and Caesar, the former at the beginning and the latter in the last century of the Republic.  On coins the only names found are Caesar and Bursio, the latter of which does not occur in ancient writers.

Due to the activity of Julius Caesar in Gaul over many years, a number of natives of the Gallic provinces adopted Julius as their gentilicum, and have no other connection to the Republican Julii. Examples of their descendants include Julius Florus, and Gaius Julius Civilis. Other Julii are descended from the numerous freedmen, and it may have been assumed by some out of vanity and ostentation.

Iullus
Iullus, also written as Iulus and Jullus, was the surname of the eldest branch of the Julii to appear in Roman history.  The gens claimed descent from Iulus, who was in some manner connected with Aeneas, although the traditions differed with respect to the details.

In some accounts, Iulus was the son of Aeneas and Creüsa, who came to Latium from the ruins of Troy, together with his father and others seeking a land in which to settle.  In others, Ascanius was the son of Creüsa, while Iulus was the son of Lavinia, daughter of Latinus, the king of Latium with whom Aeneas made peace after landing in Italy.  In still different accounts, Iulus was the son not of Aeneas, but of Ascanius.

Perhaps an indigenous origin of the name is suggested by the De Origo Gentis Romanae of Aurelius Victor, in which Iulus and Ascanius are identical.  Described as the son of Jupiter, he was originally known as Jobus, and then Julus.  This calls to mind the use of Jove for Jupiter, and the Dictionary of Greek and Roman Biography and Mythology suggests that Iulus might be a diminutive of Dius, which is also the root of Jupiter.  Furthermore, Livy reports that after his death Aeneas was worshiped as Jupiter Indiges, "the local Jove".  This suggests the early fusion of the Aeneas story with a local cult hero, said to have been the son of Jupiter.

Irrespective of the historicity of the Iulus of Roman myth, there is little reason to doubt that Iullus was an ancient personal name, perhaps even a praenomen, and that Julius is a patronymic surname built upon it.  Iullus seems to be the original and better attested spelling, although the trisyllabic form Iulus became common after Vergil introduced it in his Aeneid.

Libo
During the century and a half between the last records of the Julii Iuli and the first appearance of the Julii Caesares, we encounter a Lucius Julius Libo, consul in BC 267.  His surname Chase translates as "sprinkler", deriving it from libare, and suggests that it might originally have signified the libation pourer at religious ceremonies.  It is not certain whether the name was personal, or whether the consul inherited it from his father and grandfather, of whom all we know is that they were named Lucius.  Some scholars have supposed that Libo was descended from the Julii Iuli, and that Lucius, the father of Sextus Julius Caesar, was his son; but the evidence is very slight.

Caesar
The Dictionary of Greek and Roman Biography and Mythology says this of the cognomen Caesar:
It is uncertain which member of the Julia gens first obtained the surname of Caesar, but the first who occurs in history is Sextus Julius Caesar, praetor in BC 208.  The origin of the name is equally uncertain. Spartianus, in his life of Aelius Verus, mentions four different opinions respecting its origin:
That the word signified an elephant in the language of the Moors, and was given as a surname to one of the Julii because he had killed an elephant.
That it was given to one of the Julii because he had been cut (caesus) out of his mother's womb after her death; or
Because he had been born with a great quantity of hair (caesaries) on his head; or
Because he had azure-colored (caesii) eyes of an almost supernatural kind.
Of these opinions, the third, which is also given by Festus, seems to come nearest the truth.  Caesar and caesaries are both probably connected with the Sanskrit kêsa, "hair", and it is quite in accordance with the Roman custom for a surname to be given to an individual from some peculiarity in his personal appearance.  The second opinion, which seems to have been the most popular one with the ancient writers, arose without doubt from a false etymology.  With respect to the first, which was the one adopted, says Spartianus, by the most learned men, it is impossible to disprove it absolutely, as we know next to nothing of the ancient Moorish language; but it has no inherent probability in it; and the statement of Servius is undoubtedly false, that the grandfather of the dictator obtained the surname on account of killing an elephant with his own hand in Africa, as there were several of the Julii with this name before his time.

An inquiry into the etymology of this name is of some interest, as no other name has ever obtained such celebrity — "clarum et duraturum cum aeternitate mundi nomen."Festus, s. v. Caesar.  It was assumed by Augustus as the adopted son of the dictator, and was by Augustus handed down to his adopted son Tiberius.  It continued to be used by Caligula, Claudius, and Nero, as members either by adoption or female descent of Caesar's family; but though the family became extinct with Nero, succeeding emperors still retained it as part of their titles, and it was the practice to prefix it to their own name, as for instance, Imperator Caesar Domitianus Augustus.  When Hadrian adopted Aelius Verus, he allowed the latter to take the title of Caesar; and from this time, though the title of Augustus continued to be confined to the reigning prince, that of Caesar was also granted to the second person in the state and the heir presumptive to the throne.

Members

 Proculus Julius, a legendary figure who announced the apotheosis of Romulus to the Roman people, circa 716 BC.

Julii Iulli
 Lucius Julius, father of the consul of 489 BC
 Gaius Julius L. f. Iullus, consul in 489 BC.
 Gaius Julius C. f. L. n. Iullus, consul in 482 BC, and one of the decemvirs in 451.
 Vopiscus Julius C. f. L. n. Iullus, consul in 473 BC.
 Gaius Julius C. f. C. n. Iullus, consul in 447 and 435 BC.
 Spurius Julius Vop. f. C. n. Iullus, father of the consular tribunes of 408, 405, and 403 BC, according to the Capitoline Fasti.
 Lucius Julius Vop. f. C. n. Iullus, consular tribune in 438, and consul in 430 BC.
 Sextus Julius Iulus, consular tribune in 424 BC.
 Gaius Julius Sp. f. Vop. n. Iullus, consular tribune in 408 and 405 BC, and censor in 393.
 Lucius Julius Sp. f. Vop. n. Iullus, consular tribune in 403 BC, continued the siege against Veii.
 Lucius Julius L. f. Vop. n. Iullus, consular tribune in 401 and 397 BC.
 Lucius Julius Iullus, consular tribune in 388 and 379 BC.
 Gaius Julius Iullus, nominated dictator in 352 BC, ostensibly to carry on war against the Etruscans, but in fact to carry the election of two patricians in the consular comitia, in violation of the lex Licinia Sextia.

Julii Mentones
 Gaius Julius Mento, consul in 431 BC.
 Gaius Julius Mento, a rhetorician, cited by Seneca.

Julii Libones
 Lucius Julius Libo, grandfather of the consul of 267 BC.
 Lucius Julius L. f. Libo, father of the consul of 267 BC.
 Lucius Julius L. f. L. n. Libo, consul in 267 BC, triumphed over the Sallentini.

Julii Caesares

 Lucius Julius (Caesar?), father of the praetor of 208 BC.
 Sextus Julius (L. f.) Caesar, praetor in 208 BC, obtained the province of Sicilia, father of the praetor of 166 BC and the consul of 157 BC.
 Lucius Julius (Sex. f. L. n.) Caesar, praetor in 183 BC, had the province of Gallia Cisalpina.
 Lucius Julius (L. f. Sex. n.) Caesar, praetor in 166 BC.
 Sextus Julius Sex. f. L. n. Caesar, consul in 157 BC.
 Gaius Julius (Sex. f. L. n.) Caesar, great-grandfather of the dictator.
 Sextus Julius (Sex. f. Sex. n.) Caesar, praetor urbanus in 123 BC; he is probably the same Sextus Julius Caesar who was triumvir monetalis about this time.
 Lucius Julius Sex. f. Sex. n. Caesar, father of the consul of 90 BC, married Popillia, widow of Quintus Lutatius Catulus, and mother of Quintus Lutatius Catulus, consul in 102 BC.
 Gaius Julius (C. f. Sex. n.) Caesar, grandfather of the dictator, married Marcia.
 Lucius Julius L. f. Sex. n. Caesar, consul in 90 BC, during the Social War, and censor in 89.
 Julia L. f. L. n., wife of Marcus Antonius Creticus, and mother of Mark Antony, the triumvir. After his death, she married Publius Cornelius Lentulus Sura, one of Catiline's conspirators.
 Gaius Julius L. f. Sex. n. Caesar Strabo Vopiscus, a notable orator and poet, proscribed and put to death by Marius and Cinna in 87 BC.
 Gaius Julius C. f. (C. n.) Caesar, praetor, governor of Asia, and father of the dictator, married Aurelia.
 Lucius Julius L. f. L. n. Caesar, consul in 64 BC.
 Lucius Julius L. f. L. n. Caesar, a partisan of Pompeius during the Civil War.
 Julia C. f. (C. n.), aunt of the dictator, married Gaius Marius.
 Sextus Julius C. f. (C. n.) Caesar, consul in 91 BC, uncle of the dictator.
 Gaius Julius C. f. C. n. Caesar, consul in 59, 48, 46, 45, and 44 BC, dictator in 49, and from 47 to 44 BC.
 Julia C. f. C. n., elder sister of the dictator, and wife of Lucius Pinarius and Quintus Pedius.
 Julia C. f. C. n., younger sister of the dictator, and wife of Marcus Atius Balbus.
 Julia C. f. C. n., daughter of the dictator, and wife of Gnaeus Pompeius Magnus.
 Caesarion, the son of the dictator by Cleopatra, executed by order of Augustus in 30 BC.
 Sextus Julius Sex. f. C. n. Caesar, Flamen Quirinalis in 57 BC.
 Sextus Julius Sex. f. Sex. n. Caesar, appointed governor of Syria in 47 BC, killed in a revolt of the soldiers.
 Gaius Julius C. f. C. n. Caesar Octavianus, adopted son of the dictator, afterwards the emperor Augustus.

Julio-Claudian dynasty

 Imperator Caesar divi f. C. n. Augustus, emperor from 27 BC to AD 14.
 Julia Augusta, empress of Augustus, and mother of the emperor Tiberius.
 Julia C. f. C. n., daughter of Augustus by his second wife, Scribonia, married first Marcus Claudius Marcellus, second Marcus Vipsanius Agrippa, and lastly, the emperor Tiberius.
 Gaius (Julius) Caesar Augusti f. divi n., the eldest son of Agrippa and Julia, adopted by Augustus.
 Lucius (Julius) Caesar Augusti f. divi n., the second son of Agrippa and Julia, adopted by Augustus.
 Agrippa Julius Caesar Augusti f. divi n., the third son of Agrippa and Julia, adopted by Augustus.
 Tiberius (Julius) Caesar Augusti f. divi n. Augustus, emperor from AD 14 to 37.
 Drusus Julius Ti. f. Caesar, son of the emperor Tiberius, was probably poisoned in AD 23 by Sejanus.
 Tiberius Julius Caesar Nero Gemellus, son of Drusus, was killed by the emperor Caligula.
 Germanicus Julius Ti. f. Caesar, nephew of Tiberius.
 Gaius Julius Caesar, son of Germanicus, died in early childhood.
 Nero Julius Caesar, son of Germanicus, was exiled during the reign of Tiberius and died under unclear circumstances in AD 31.
 Drusus Julius Caesar, son of Germanicus, was likewise exiled by Tiberius, and is said to have starved to death in AD 33.
 Gaius (Julius) Caesar Germanicus, son of Germanicus, better known as Caligula, emperor from AD 37 to 41.
 Julia Agrippina, daughter of Germanicus, and mother of the emperor Nero.
 Julia Drusilla, daughter of Germanicus, married first Lucius Cassius Longinus, and second Marcus Aemilius Lepidus.
 Julia Livilla, daughter of Germanicus, married Marcus Vinicius, consul in AD 30.
 Julia C. f. Drusilla, daughter of Caligula, was murdered by the Praetorian Guard in AD 41.

Others

First century BC
 Lucius Julius Bursio, triumvir monetalis in 85 BC.
 Julius Polyaenus, a contemporary of Caesar, and the author of four epigrams in the Anthologia Graeca.
 Lucius Julius Calidus, a poet in the final years of the Republic, proscribed by Volumnius, the partisan of Marcus Antonius, but saved through the intercession of Atticus.
 Gaius Julius Hyginus, a freedman of Augustus, appointed head of the Palatine library, and the author of numerous books about history, mythology, and science.
 Julius Modestus, a freedman of Gaius Julius Hyginus, who became a distinguished grammarian, and the author of Quaestiones Confusae.
 Julius Marathas, a freedman of Augustus, who wrote a life of his master.
 Marcus Julius Cottius, king of several Alpine tribes of the Ligures, submitted to Augustus and granted the title of Praefectus.

First century

 Julius Florus, an orator, jurist, poet, and either the author or editor of several satires during the reign of Augustus.  He accompanied Tiberius to Armenia, and may have been the uncle of Julius Secundus, and perhaps the friend of Quintilian, who calls him an eminent orator of Gaul.
 Julius Florus, leader of an insurrection of the Treveri during the reign of Tiberius.
 Julius Sacrovir, a leader of the Aedui, who together with Julius Florus revolted in AD 21.
 Julius Secundus Florus, an orator and friend of Quintilian, and nephew of the Gallic orator.
 Julius Montanus, a senator, poet, and friend of Tiberius, cited by both the elder and younger Seneca. After the emperor Nero assaulted him in the dark, Montanus resisted forcefully before recognizing his attacker and begging for mercy, but he was compelled to commit suicide.
 Sextus Julius Postumus, used by Sejanus in one of his schemes, AD 23.
 Julius Africanus, of the Gallic state of the Santones, was condemned by Tiberius in AD 32.
 Julius Celsus, a tribune of the city cohort, was condemned to death under Tiberius, but broke his own neck in prison, in order to avoid a public execution.
 Julius Canus, a Stoic philosopher, condemned to death by the emperor Caligula.  He had promised to appear to his friends after his death, and fulfilled his promise by appearing to one of them in a vision.
 Julius Graecinus, a writer on botany, and the father of Gnaeus Julius Agricola, was put to death by Caligula.
 Gaius Julius Callistus, a freedman of Caligula, influential during his reign and that of Claudius.
 Gaius Julius Sex. f. Postumus, governor of Egypt from AD 45 to 48.
 Marcus Julius Romulus, adlected into the Senate after serving as tribune of the plebs, also served as legate of the Legio XV Apollinaris, and proconsul of Macedonia.
 Gaius Julius M. f. Donnus, son of Marcus Julius Cottius, prefect of the Ligures, fought for Tiberius.
 Marcus Julius M. f. Cottius, another son of Marcus Julius Cottius, prefect of the Ligures, was granted title of king by the emperor Claudius.
 Julius Pelignus, Procurator of Cappadocia in the reign of Claudius, AD 52.
 Julius Bassus, said by the elder Plinius to have written a medical work in Greek.
 Gaius Julius Aquila, an eques, sent to protect Cotys, King of the Bosporus, in AD 50.
 Julius Densus, an eques during the reign of Nero, accused of being too favorably disposed towards Britannicus in AD 56.
 Julius Diocles of Carystus, author of four epigrams in the Greek Anthology.
 Gaius Julius Alpinus Classicianus, procurator of Britannia from AD 61 to 65.
 Julia Pacata, the wife of Classicanus.
 Julius Indus, a cavalry commander of the Treveri, and the father-in-law of Classicanus.
 Julius Africanus, a celebrated orator in the reign of Nero.
 Lucius Julius Rufus, consul in AD 67.  His death is related by the elder Pliny.
 Gaius Julius Vindex, one of the chief supporters of Galba, led the rebellion against Nero.
 Julius Fronto, a supporter of Otho, put in chains by the soldiers because his brother, Julius Gratus, was a supporter of Vitellius.
 Julius Gratus, prefect of the camp in the army of Aulus Caecina Alienus, the general of Vitellius, was put in chains by the soldiers because his brother, Julius Fronto, supported Otho.
 Julius Carus, one of the murderers of Titus Vinius when the emperor Galba was put to death in AD 69.
 Gaius Julius Civilis, leader of the Batavian Rebellion in AD 69.
 Julius Classicus, of the Treveri, who with Civilis was one of the leaders of the Batavian Rebellion.
 Julius Paulus, the brother of Civilis, was put to death on a false charge of treason by Gaius Fonteius Capito, the governor of Germania Inferior.
 Julius Briganticus, a nephew of Civilis, who fought under Cerealis in Germania, and fell in battle in AD 71.
 Julius Sabinus, of the Lingones, joined in the revolt of the Batavi.
 Julius Tutor, of the Treviri, joined in the rebellion of Classicus.
 Julius Calenus, of the Aedui, a partisan of Vitellius, was sent to Gaul as proof of the emperor's defeat at Cremona in AD 69.
 Julius Priscus, appointed Praetorian Prefect by Vitellius in AD 69, he failed to hold the passes of the Apennines, and returned to Rome in disgrace.
 Julius Placidus, tribune of a cohort in the army of Vespasian, who dragged Vitellius from his hiding place.
 Julius Burdo, commander of the Roman fleet in Germania, in AD 70.  Previously suspected by the soldiers of having a hand in the death of Gaius Fonteius Capito, he was protected by Vitellius.
 Sextus Julius Gabinianus, a celebrated rhetorician who taught in Gaul during the time of Vespasian, and was spoken of by Suetonius in De Claris Rhetoribus.
 Julia Procilla, the mother of Agricola.
 Gnaeus Julius Agricola, consul in AD 77, the conqueror of Britannia.
 Julius Cerealis, a poet, and a friend and contemporary of the younger Pliny and Martial.
 Tiberius Julius Lupus, governor of Roman Egypt from 71 to 73.
 Lucius Julius Marinus, governor of Bithynia and Pontus at some point between AD 85 and 89.
 Julius Rufus, a writer of satires, contemporary with Martial.
 Sextus Julius Frontinus, twice consul in the late first century, and author of De Aquaeductu.
 Gaius Junius Silanus, consul suffectus in AD 92.
 Julius Naso, a friend of both the younger Pliny and Tacitus, who were interested in his success as a candidate for public office.
 Julius Calvaster, a military tribune who took part in the rebellion of Lucius Antonius Saturninus, but was pardoned by Domitian.
 Julius Ferox, consul suffectus from the Kalends of November in AD 100, and subsequently Curator of the Banks and Courses of the Tiber, and of the Cloaca Maxima.  He is sometimes confused with the jurist Urseius Ferox.

Second century

 Lucius Julius Ursus, consul in AD 84, 98, and 100.
 Gaius Julius Servilius Ursus Servianus, the brother-in-law of Hadrian, and consul in AD 107, 111, and 136.
 Gaius Julius Lacer, an architect during the reign of Trajan.  His name is inscribed upon the famous bridge over the Tagus, which he built, and which still stands.
 Gaius Julius Africanus, grandson of the orator, consul suffectus in AD 108.
 Gaius Julius Antiochus Epiphanes Philopappus, a prince of Commagene, consul suffectus in AD 109.
 Julius Severianus, a rhetorician in the time of Hadrian, and the author of Syntomata, or Praecepta Artis Rhetoricae.
 Sextus Julius Severus, governor of Britannia and Bithynia under Hadrian, was sent to Judaea to suppress the Bar Kokhba revolt.
 Julius Aquila, a jurist, probably of the late second century.
 Lucius Julius Aquila, the author of De Etrusca Disciplina, a work on Etruscan religion.
 Julius Vestinus, a sophist, who made an abridgement of the lexicon of Pamphilus.
 Julius Pollux, a Greek sophist and grammarian, and a teacher of grammar and rhetoric at Athens during the reign of Commodus.
 Julius Titianus, a scholar and writer of the late second century, and the father of the rhetorician Titianus.
 Julius Titianus, a rhetorician, and tutor of the younger Maximinus.
 Julius Solon, purchased the rank of senator under Commodus, but put to death by Septimius Severus, at the commencement of his reign.
 Julius Crispus, a distinguished tribune of the Praetorian Guard, capriciously put to death by Septimius Severus during the Parthian War in AD 199.
 Julius Rufus, a nobilis, slain by Septimius Severus.
Lucius Julius Julianus, legate of the Legio II Augusta.

Third century
 Julius Frontinus, a Latin rhetorician, who gave instruction in his art to Severus Alexander.
 Julius Granianus, a rhetorician at the time of Severus Alexander, who was instructed by him in rhetoric.
 Julius Paulus, a distinguished jurist and prolific writer on the law, during the early third century.
 Julius Martialis, joined the conspiracy against the emperor Caracalla, whom he killed with his own hand, before being slain by the emperor's Scythian guards.
 Sextus Julius Africanus, a chronographer and Christian writer of the early third century.
 Gaius Julius Solinus, a grammarian and geographer, probably of the early third century.
 Julia Aquilia Severa, a Vestal Virgin, scandalously taken as a wife by the emperor Elagabalus.
 Gaius Julius Maximinus, equestrian governor of Mauretania Tingitana, between AD 222 and 235.
 Gaius Julius Verus Maximinus, surnamed Thrax, emperor from AD 235 to 238.
 Marcus Julius Philippus, also known as Philip the Arab, emperor from AD 244 to 249.
 Marcus Julius M. f. Philippus, emperor with his father from AD 247 to 249.
 Gaius Julius Saturninus, a name assigned to the younger Marcus Julius Philippus by Aurelius Victor.
 Quintus Julius Gallienus, a son of the emperor Gallienus, who probably predeceased his father.
 Julius Aterianus, said to have written a history of Victorinus, and perhaps others of the Thirty Tyrants.
 Julius Saturninus, usurper against the emperor Probus in AD 280.

Fourth century
 Julius Capitolinus, the supposed author of nine biographies in the Historia Augusta.
 Flavius Julius Crispus, son of the emperor Constantine I; a distinguished soldier, he was put to death at the instigation of his stepmother in AD 326.
 Julius Firmicus Maternus, a fourth-century astrologer and writer on the subject of profane religions.
 Julius Valerius Alexander Polemius, a historian who translated a Greek life of Alexander the Great; he is likely the same Polemius who was consul in AD 338.
 Julius Obsequens, perhaps of the fourth century, an author of a tract known as De Prodigiis, or Prodigiorum Libellus, describing various prodigies and phenomena found in the works of earlier writers.
 Gaius Julius Victor, a rhetorician of the fourth century.
 Julius Ausonius, an eminent physician, and praefectus of Illyricum under the emperor Valentinian I.
 (Julius) Ausonius, also called Decimus Magnus Ausonius, son of the physician, a celebrated poet.
 Julia Dryadia, daughter of the physician Julius Ausonius.
 Julius Rufinianus, a Latin rhetorician of uncertain date, and the author of a treatise called De Figuris Sententiarum et Elocutionis.
 Julius Paris, author of an epitome of Valerius Maximus, written perhaps in the fourth or fifth century.

Fifth century and after
 Julius Valerius Majorianus, emperor from AD 457 to 461.
 Julius Nepos, emperor in AD 474 and 475.
 Julius Exsuperantius, a late Roman historian, probably of the fifth or sixth century; his tract, De Marii, Lepidi, ac Sertorii Bellis Civilibus may have been abridged from the histories of Sallust.
 Claudius Julius or Joläus, a Greek historian of unknown date, wrote works on Phoenicia and the Peloponnesus.
 Julius Celsus, a scholar at Constantinople in the seventh century, who made a recension of the text of Caesar's commentaries.

See also
 List of Roman gentes

Notes

References

Citations

Bibliography

 Diodorus Siculus, Bibliotheca Historica (Library of History).
 Titus Livius (Livy), History of Rome.
 Dionysius of Halicarnassus, Romaike Archaiologia (Roman Antiquities).
 Marcus Tullius Cicero, De Haruspicum Responsis.
 Cornelius Nepos, De Viris Illustribus (On the Lives of Famous Men).
 Publius Ovidius Naso (Ovid), Fasti.
 Lucius Annaeus Seneca (Seneca the Elder), Controversiae.
 Lucius Annaeus Seneca (Seneca the Younger), De Beneficiis, Epistulae Morales ad Lucilium (Moral Letters to Lucilius).
 Gaius Plinius Secundus (Pliny the Elder), Naturalis Historia (Natural History).
 Gaius Plinius Caecilius Secundus (Pliny the Younger), Epistulae (Letters).
 Marcus Valerius Martialis (Martial), Epigrams.
 Marcus Fabius Quintilianus (Quintilian), Institutio Oratoria (Institutes of Oratory).
 Publius Cornelius Tacitus, Annales, Dialogus de Oratoribus (Dialogue on Oratory).
 Publius Cornelius Tacitus, Historiae.
 Publius Cornelius Tacitus, De vita et moribus Iulii Agricolae (On the Life and Mores of Julius Agricola).
 Publius Cornelius Tacitus, Dialogus de Oratoribus (Dialogue on Oratory).
 Gaius Suetonius Tranquillus, De Claris Rhetoribus (The Eminent Orators); De Illustribus Grammaticis (The Illustrious Grammarians); De Vita Caesarum (Lives of the Caesars, or The Twelve Caesars).
 Aulus Gellius, Noctes Atticae (Attic Nights).
 Sextus Pompeius Festus, epitome of Marcus Verrius Flaccus, De Verborum Significatu.
 Lucius Cassius Dio Cocceianus (Cassius Dio), Roman History.
 Eusebius of Caesarea, Chronicon.
 Aelius Lampridius, Aelius Spartianus, Julius Capitolinus, Trebellius Pollio, et al., Historia Augusta.
 Sextus Aurelius Victor, De Caesaribus (On the Caesars); De Origo Gentis Romanae (On the Origin of the Roman People); Epitome de Caesaribus (attributed).
 Decimius Magnus Ausonius, Epigrammata de Diversis Rebus (Epigrams about Various Things).
 Maurus Servius Honoratus, Ad Virgilii Aeneidem Commentarii (Commentary on Vergil's Aeneid).
 Gaius Sollius Modestus Apollinaris Sidonius, Epistulae.
 Macrobius Ambrosius Theodosius, Saturnalia.
 Stephanus of Byzantium, Ethnica.
 Isidorus Hispalensis, Origines.
 Suda.
 Jan Gruter, Inscriptiones Antiquae Totius Orbis Romani, Heidelberg (1603).
 Anthologia Graeca (The Greek Anthology), ed. Tauchnitz.
 Joseph Hilarius Eckhel, Doctrina Numorum Veterum.
 Barthold Georg Niebuhr, The History of Rome, Julius Charles Hare and Connop Thirlwall, trans., John Smith, Cambridge (1828).
 Angelo Mai, Classici Auctores e Vaticanis Codicibus Editi (Classical Authors Published by the Vatican), Rome, (1835).
 Dictionary of Greek and Roman Biography and Mythology, William Smith, ed., Little, Brown and Company, Boston (1849).
 Theodor Mommsen et alii, Corpus Inscriptionum Latinarum (The Body of Latin Inscriptions, abbreviated CIL), Berlin-Brandenburgische Akademie der Wissenschaften (1853–present).
 René Cagnat et alii, L'Année épigraphique (The Year in Epigraphy, abbreviated AE), Presses Universitaires de France (1888–present).
 George Davis Chase, "The Origin of Roman Praenomina", in Harvard Studies in Classical Philology, vol. VIII (1897).
 
 T. Robert S. Broughton, The Magistrates of the Roman Republic, American Philological Association (1952).
 
 Guido Bastianini, "Lista dei prefetti d'Egitto dal 30a al 299p", in Zeitschrift für Papyrologie und Epigraphik, vol. 17 (1975).
 J.E.H. Spaul, "Governors of Tingitana", in Antiquités Africaines, vol. 30 (1994).
 Miriam Griffin, A Companion to Julius Caesar John Wiley & Sons (2009), .

Alba Longa
 
Roman gentes